Janet Wells now Janet Reeves (born 1957) is an alpine skier from New Zealand. 
 
In the 1976 Winter Olympics at Innsbruck, she came 41st in the giant slalom.

Janet Reeves is now a personal trainer in Christchurch, New Zealand, with her own company, Body by Jan.

References

External links 
 
 

Living people
1957 births
New Zealand female alpine skiers
Olympic alpine skiers of New Zealand
Alpine skiers at the 1976 Winter Olympics